Muengnenshime Sunday Goshit (born 1 March 1994) is a Nigerian footballer who plays as a midfielder for FC Tucson in  USL League One.

Career

College
Sunday played college soccer at Drake University between 2013 and 2016, scoring 4 goals and tallying 10 assists in 72 appearances for the Bulldogs.

Amateur
From 2014 and 2019, Sunday played with USL League Two sides Des Moines Menace, making a total of 39 regular season appearances for the club, scoring 3 goals during the 2014 season. He helped Des Moines to three regular season championships and five Heartland Division titles during his time at the club.

Professional
Sunday signed with USL Championship side OKC Energy on 12 February 2021 following a successful tryout in 2020. Due to COVID-19 restrictions, Sunday was unable to officially sign with Energy FC until 2021. He made his professional debut on 24 April 2021, starting in a 3–1 loss to FC Tulsa.

Sunday signed with FC Tucson on 23 March 2022.

References

External links
 Soccerway profile

1994 births
Living people
Association football defenders
Nigerian footballers
Nigerian expatriate footballers
Nigerian expatriate sportspeople in the United States
Expatriate soccer players in the United States
Soccer players from Iowa
Drake Bulldogs men's soccer players
Des Moines Menace players
OKC Energy FC players
FC Tucson players
USL League One players
USL League Two players
USL Championship players